Carlos Augusto dos Santos da Silva (born ), known as Kaká, is a Brazilian-born Italian futsal player who plays as a pivot for Fuorigrotta and the Italy national futsal team.

Honours

Individual
 Serie A top scorer (3): 2008-09, 2012-13, 2015-16

References

External links
The Final Ball profile

1987 births
Living people
Brazilian men's futsal players
Italian men's futsal players